"Cherish the Day" is a song by English band Sade from their fourth studio album, Love Deluxe (1992). It was released as the album's fourth and final single in the United Kingdom on 19 July 1993.

Critical reception
Justin Chadwick from Albumism described the song as "soaring", adding that "a wistful Adu sings of finding a love so supreme that nothing in this life or beyond can ever compete". Tanya Rena Jefferson of AXS stated, "This joyous soulful song embraces one to cherish each and every day." Troy J. Augusto from Cashbox said it "sports Sade's usual understated musical arrangement, allowing the lead vocals, even as laid back as they are, to be the centerpiece of the song." The Daily Vault's Mark Millan called it "enchanting", adding it as "one of the album's finest moments as the guys offer a minimal but lush track for Adu to weave her tale of the ultimate love, all the while finally exploring her considerable vocal range." Ron Fell from the Gavin Report noted that "the sweet surrender" of the song is "timeless and classic Sade and could have come from any of her previous three volumes of platinum cool." 

Sophie Heawood of The Guardian commented "The band at their most abstractly evocative: at their best, they could do a remarkable amount with very little – as proved by this song, during which immense yearning is conveyed." Pan-European magazine Music & Media wrote, "Despite the artwork, showing Sade with a guitar and a stack of speakers in the background, she hasn't rocked up her sound. On the contrary, with a lonely drum track on a synth carpet, 'ambient soul' is within reach." James Hamilton from Music Weeks RM Dance Update described it as a "lovely languid tranquil smoocher". Frank Guan of Vulture added, "Her minimalist lyrics... say all that needs to be said, and once a ten-note bassline jumps in to underscore her depth of feeling over the misty synths, the song is perfect and complete."

Music video
Filmed in black and white by Derek M. Allen, the music video for "Cherish the Day" features Sade Adu performing the song whilst playing the guitar on the rooftop of a New York City skyscraper as her bandmates and a few other people vibe to the music on the streets below.

Track listings

 UK, European and Japanese CD single"Cherish the Day" (Sade remix short version) – 5:18
"Cherish the Day" (Sade remix long version) – 6:18
"Cherish the Day" (Ronin remix) – 6:58
"Cherish the Day" (Pal Joey remix) – 6:46

 US CD single"Cherish the Day" (Sade remix) – 6:18
"Cherish the Day" (Ronin remix) – 6:58
"Cherish the Day" (Pal Joey remix) – 6:46
"Feel No Pain" (Nellee Hooper remix) – 5:09
"No Ordinary Love" (album version) – 7:18

 Australian CD single and US cassette single"Cherish the Day" (Sade remix) – 6:18
"Cherish the Day" (Ronin remix) – 6:58
"Cherish the Day" (Pal Joey remix) – 6:46

 UK and Dutch 12-inch singleA1. "Cherish the Day" (Sade remix long version) – 6:18
A2. "Cherish the Day" (Ronin remix) – 6:58
B1. "Cherish the Day" (Pal Joey remix) – 6:46
B2. "Cherish the Day" (Sade remix short version) – 5:18

 US limited-edition 12-inch singleA1. "Cherish the Day" (Sade remix long version) – 6:18
A2. "Cherish the Day" (Ronin remix) – 6:58
B1. "Cherish the Day" (Pal Joey remix) – 6:46
B2. "Feel No Pain" (Nellee Hooper remix) – 5:09
B3. "No Ordinary Love" (album edit) – 5:23

 US 7-inch single'
A1. "Cherish the Day" (Sade remix short version) – 5:18
A2. "Cherish the Day" (Ronin remix) – 6:58

Charts

References

1990s ballads
1992 songs
1993 singles
Black-and-white music videos
Epic Records singles
Music videos directed by Sophie Muller
Sade (band) songs
Song recordings produced by Mike Pela
Songs written by Sade (singer)
Songs written by Stuart Matthewman
Trip hop songs